Joseph Watkins Morris (February 26, 1879 – December 21, 1937) was a U.S. Representative from Kentucky.

Born in Sulphur, Kentucky, Morris moved to New Castle, Kentucky, with his father in 1889. He attended the public schools and was graduated from the New Castle High School in 1899. He engaged in mercantile pursuits at New Castle. From 1909 to 1923, he served as Secretary to Representative J. Campbell Cantrill. He served as delegate to many consecutive Democratic State conventions starting in 1904. He served as chairman of the Democratic State campaign committee in 1923.

Morris was elected as a Democrat to the Sixty-eighth Congress to fill the vacancy caused by the death of J. Campbell Cantrill and served from November 30, 1923, to March 3, 1925. He was not a candidate for renomination in 1924. He was state revenue agent for Kentucky 1925–1927. He was manager of a bus terminal in Louisville, Kentucky, from 1929 until his death in Louisville, Kentucky, December 21, 1937. He was interred in Odd Fellows Cemetery, Carrollton, Kentucky.

References

1879 births
1937 deaths
People from Henry County, Kentucky
Democratic Party members of the United States House of Representatives from Kentucky
People from New Castle, Kentucky